The men's single sculls competition at the 2016 Summer Paralympics in Rio de Janeiro took place are at Rodrigo de Freitas Lagoon.

Results

Heats
The winner of each heat qualify to the finals, remainder goes to the repechage.

Heat 1

Heat 2

Repechages
First two of each heat qualify to the finals, remainder goes to the Final B.

Repechage 1

Repechage 2

Finals

Final B

Final A

References

Men's single sculls